Tully Lake is a lake located by Tully Center, New York. Fish species present in the lake include carp, yellow perch, and pumpkinseed sunfish. There is access via state owned carry down on Friendly Lane. There is a 7-horsepower motor limit.

References

Lakes of New York (state)
Lakes of Onondaga County, New York
Lakes of Cortland County, New York